Days of Fire is a 1968 Italian crime-thriller film written and directed by Mino Guerrini.

Plot

Cast 
 Joseph Cotten as Fabio Destil
 Franca Polesello as  Franca
 Giulio Brogi as  Rudy
 Giampiero Albertini as Sempre si 
 Bruno Corazzari as Affattato 
 Dennis Patrick Kilbane as  Biochemist
 Jean Louis as  Affatato's accomplice
 Milly Vitale as  Anna 
 Franco Ressel as Passenger 
 Linda Sini

Production
Days of Fire was written by Fernando Di Leo under the title Elegia in un cimitero d'asfalto o Il sol nero (.

Release
Days of Fire was distributed theatrically in Italy by I.N.D.I.E.F. on 30 April 1968. The film grossed a total of 83,977,000 Italian lire domestically. Italian film historian and critic Roberto Curti stated that the movie was "unnoticed before critics and audiences alike". Curti stated the film was not re-discovered until the late 1990s.

The film has been released as Gangsters '70 and Days of Fire.  It was released in Canada on VHS by the UVI label in Italian.

References

Footnotes

Sources

External links

1960s crime thriller films
1960s heist films
Italian heist films
Films directed by Mino Guerrini
Italian gangster films
1960s Italian films